The Clare by-election of 1828 was notable as this was the first time since the reformation that an openly Roman Catholic MP, Daniel O'Connell was elected.

The Roman Catholic Relief Act 1793 had extended the franchise to Catholics in Ireland. However, under the Oath of Supremacy required of MPs to take their seats, Catholics were not permitted to sit in the House of Commons of the United Kingdom. This requirement was confirmed under the Act of Union.

Clare was held by William Vesey Fitzgerald when he was appointed as President of the Board of Trade. As this was seen to be an office of profit, Vesey-FitzGerald had to stand in a by-election. It was not unusual for such ministerial by-elections to be uncontested. However, the Catholic Association, a group campaigning had vowed to oppose every member of the current government, which had declined to allow for Catholic Emancipation. Vesey-FitzGerald was reasonably popular with Catholics in Clare, and a number of candidates were approached but refused to stand.

Although Catholics were disqualified from sitting in the House of Commons, there was no law preventing them from running for election. Daniel O'Connell decided to stand, although he would not be permitted to take his seat if elected.

Like all parliamentary elections prior to the Ballot Act 1872, Clare was held as an open vote, which meant that all votes would be known. This meant that Protestant and pro-union landowners could influence their tenants, who were far more likely to be Catholic and anti-union.

Result
O'Connell won the by-election, but could not take the Oath of Supremacy, which was incompatible with Catholicism and so could not take his seat in parliament. This meant that his demand rose to allow him to become an MP for County Clare as it did not have representation. O'Connell hinted that he would get more Catholics elected to force the situation saying "they must crush us or conciliate us".

Consequences
After O'Connell refused to take the Oath, his seat was vacated. In a second by-election, in July 1829, O'Connell was elected unopposed.

The Prime Minister, the Duke of Wellington, and the Home Secretary, Sir Robert Peel, who had previously opposed Catholic participation in Parliament, saw that denying O'Connell his seat would cause outrage and could lead to another rebellion or uprising in Ireland, which was about 85% Catholic. This led directly to the Roman Catholic Relief Act 1829.

References

Ministerial by-elections to the Parliament of the United Kingdom
1828 in Ireland
By-elections to the Parliament of the United Kingdom in County Clare constituencies
1828 elections in the United Kingdom
1820s elections in Ireland